Nicolas Carvallo (born 1991) is a Chilean alpine ski racer.

He competed at the 2015 World Championships in Beaver Creek, USA, in the Super-G.

References

1991 births
Chilean male alpine skiers
Living people